The 1940 NCAA Wrestling Championships were the 13th NCAA Wrestling Championships to be held. The University of Illinois in Champaign, Illinois hosted the tournament at Huff Gymnasium.

Oklahoma A&M took home the team championship with 24 points and having two individual champions.

Don Nichols of Michigan was named the Outstanding Wrestler.

Team results

Individual finals

References

NCAA Division I Wrestling Championship
Wrestling competitions in the United States
NCAA Wrestling Championships
NCAA Wrestling Championships
NCAA Wrestling Championships